Colores (English: Colors) is the fourth solo studio album (fifth overall) by Colombian reggaeton singer J Balvin, released on 19 March 2020 through Universal Latin. The album was produced by Sky Rompiendo. It was preceded by the singles "Blanco", "Morado" and "Rojo", with the latter being released the same day as the album pre-order. Each song on the album (Except "Arcoiris") received a music video directed by Colin Tilley. "Amarillo" was released as the fourth single off Colores the same day as the album's release. At the 2020 Latin Grammy Awards, the album won the Latin Grammy for Best Urban Album.

Background
The album's central concept is colors, with each track named after a color (except "Arcoiris", the Spanish term for rainbow). Balvin collaborated with the Japanese artist Takashi Murakami for the music videos and album and single artworks, which notably feature Murakami's flowers, as well as American clothing brand Guess on a capsule collection inspired by the album.

The album was announced at the end of January 2020.

Critical reception

Colores received generally positive reviews from critics. Alexis Petridis of The Guardian gave the album three out of five stars and stated that Colores "isn’t really interested in standing out by startling the listener, or reeling them in with novelty, but what Colores does have in profusion is a universal brand of pop smarts". Suzy Exposito of Rolling Stone awarded the album three and a half out of five stars, writing "Don’t let the Crayola motif fool you: Spanning 10 pigment-themed tracks, Colores is a sophisticated show of Balvin’s sonic palette". Thom Jurek of Allmusic said of the album, "There isn't much lyrical substance on Colores, and there doesn't need to be. It's a party record whose lyric flows are effortless and laid-back enough -- a Balvin trademark -- to attract listeners inside and outside musica urbano's big tent. The album's brevity adds depth and dimension to its direct, seductive, welcoming mix and garish presentation."

Lucas Villa of Consequence of Sound wrote of the album, "The brushstrokes he paints as a purveyor of perreo pop might not be as broad, but they’re far-reaching in highlighting the evolution and future of reggaeton music. Balvin remains a power player in the globalization of the #LatinoGang, and Colores continues to showcase his colorful flow and spirit as a beacon in the movement". Jenzia Burgos of Pitchfork called the album "earnest" but "slightly indulgent" and compared the visually-focused work to albums by Pharrell Williams and Kanye West, saying, "Now with his own seat at the table, J Balvin will no doubt sigue rompiendo." Ramy Abou-Setta of Clash called Colores "one of J Balvin’s strongest projects to date", and opined that the album "stays true to the reggaeton roots that J Balvin has built upon during the years of his influence on the Latino music scene. An energetic and vibrant project, that is exactly what the music scene needed in such an uncertain time".

Commercial performance 
The album debuted at number 32 on the US Billboard 200 and number 2 on the Top Latin Albums chart with first week sales of 24,000. The album eventually peaked at number 15 on Billboard 200.

Track listing

Notes
  signifies a vocal producer
 In the initial announcement of the track list, "Rosa" was listed as "Rosado".

Sample credits
 "Amarillo" contains a sample of "Angela", as written and performed by Saïan Supa Crew.

Charts

Weekly charts

Year-end charts

Certifications

References

2020 albums
J Balvin albums
Spanish-language albums
Universal Music Latino albums
Albums produced by Sky Rompiendo